Myrrophis is a genus of snakes in the family Homalopsidae.

Species
Myrrophis bennettii (Gray, 1842)
Myrrophis chinensis (Gray, 1842)

References

Further reading
Kumar AB, Sanders KL, George S, Murphy JC (2012). "The status of Eurostus dussumierii and Hypsirhina chinensis (Reptilia, Squamata, Serpentes): with comments on the origin of salt tolerance in homalopsid snakes". Systematics and Biodiversity 10 (4): 479–489. (Myrrophis, new genus).

Snake genera
Colubrids